Brisbane Correctional Centre, formerly the Sir David Longland Correctional Centre, is a prison facility located at Wacol (near Brisbane), Queensland, Australia, which was renovated and re-opened in June 2008.
The complex houses a water conservation system, a unit specifically designed for 17-year-old prisoners (which has since been closed due to amended laws), and an ultra-modern maximum security wing for prisoners considered dangerous. The facility currently consists of 16 units, including a protection unit mainly for elderly prisoners and prisoners with sexual charges, as well as a medical unit for prisoners with serious psychological problems and suicidal thoughts. A typical unit has approximately 70 prisoners.

Notable prisoners
 Brenden Abbottthe "Postcard Bandit".
 Geoffrey Robert Dobbslabelled Australia's worst paedophile, pleaded guilty to 124 sex offences and one count of attempting to pervert the course of justice on counts against 63 girls under his care as a teacher and youth leader from 1972 to 2000.
 Jason Nixonprison serial killer.

See also

 List of Australian prisons

References

Maximum security prisons in Australia
Prisons in Queensland
Wacol, Queensland
1988 establishments in Australia